The 2018–19 season was Artsakh FC's 1st season in the Armenian Premier League.

Squad

Transfers

In

Loans in

Out

Released

Competitions

Armenian Premier League

Results

Table

Armenian Cup

Statistics

Appearances and goals

|-
|colspan="16"|Players away on loan:
|-
|colspan="16"|Players who left Artsakh during the season:

|}

Goal scorers

Disciplinary Record

References

FC Noah seasons
Artsakh